The 1965 Brown Bears football team was an American football team that represented Brown University during the 1965 NCAA University Division football season. Brown tied for last in the Ivy League. 

In their seventh season under head coach John McLaughry, the Bears compiled a 2–7 record and were outscored 169 to 128. Quarterback Bob Hall and defensive end Rich O’Toole were the team captains. 

The Bears' 1–6 conference record tied for seventh in the Ivy League standings. They were outscored by Ivy opponents 208 to 61. 

Brown played its home games at Brown Stadium in Providence, Rhode Island.

Schedule

References

Brown
Brown Bears football seasons
Brown Bears football